Nebria walterheinzi is a species of ground beetle in the Nebriinae subfamily that is endemic to Turkey.

References

walterheinzi
Beetles described in 1990
Beetles of Asia
Endemic fauna of Turkey